Bagsværd station is a station on the Farum radial of the S-train network in Copenhagen, Denmark.

History

The station was not one of the original stations on the Slangerup Railway. It opened on 2+ April 1906 and was converted into an S-train station on 25 September 1977.

Service
Bagsværd Station is served by B and Bx trains.

See also
 List of railway stations in Denmark

References

S-train (Copenhagen) stations
Railway stations opened in 1906
Railway stations in Denmark opened in the 20th century